Shahr-e Deraz (also Romanized as Shahr-e Derāz; also known as Chāh-e Derāz and Chāh-i-Darāz) is a village in Ladiz Rural District, in the Central District of Mirjaveh County, Sistan and Baluchestan Province, Iran. At the 2006 census, its population was 112, in 25 families.

References 

Populated places in Mirjaveh County